Mutara II Rwogera was the King of Rwanda from 1830 to his death in June 1853. Under his rule and that of his successor Kigeli IV Rwabugiri, the kingdom reached its pinnacle of power. 

After 1 June 1853, King Mutara II Rwogera died of an illness, but a non-governmental organization prevented Abiru from informing Queen Nyiramavugo Nyiramongi about his death, a non-governmental organization because he had refused to drink and should not stay after the king. 

Rwabugili, inherited his father's kingdom, and did a great job of restoring it.

See also 

 List of kings of Rwanda

References

External links 
 List of Kings of Rwanda

1853 deaths
Rwandan kings
19th-century monarchs in Africa
1802 births